The Zip Feed Tower was a grain elevator and feed mill in Sioux Falls, South Dakota. At  it was the tallest occupiable structure in South Dakota from its construction in 1956–57 until its demolition in December 2005. The mill closed in 2000 and in 2005 was scheduled for demolition to make way for office and retail space.

Attempted demolition 
On December 3, 2005, workers unsuccessfully attempted to implode the building. The concrete tower fell into its own basement, leaning to one side but still standing. Demolition crews had attempted to drop the structure by cutting reinforcing bars throughout the structure, then placing explosive charges in a ring around the base and up between the vertical silos. However, the integrity of the structure was such that, as the base was sheared off, the main structure dropped straight down, crashing through the damaged base and into the basement.

A review of the demolition project proved that the crew had seriously underestimated the amount of cutting explosive required to "break" the structure's vertical integrity. Over the next two weeks, a crane and wrecking ball were used to complete the demolition. The tallest building in Sioux Falls today is the 11-story CenturyLink Tower.

References

Infrastructure completed in 1957
Buildings and structures in Sioux Falls, South Dakota
Towers in South Dakota
Demolished buildings and structures in South Dakota
Grain elevators in the United States
Agricultural buildings and structures in South Dakota
Buildings and structures demolished in 2005